Marsiliana, known also as Marsiliana d'Albegna, is a village in Tuscany, central Italy, administratively a frazione of the comune of Manciano, province of Grosseto. At the time of the 2001 census its population amounted to 246.

Geography 
Marsiliana is about 40 km from Grosseto and 18 km from Manciano. It is situated in southern Maremma, along the Maremmana Regional Road halfway between Manciano and the Tyrrhenian Sea at Albinia. The old centre of Marsiliana is situated on the top of a hill overlooking the river Albegna.

History 
The territory of Marsiliana is known for the presence of Etruscan archaeological sites: the most important one is the area of Banditella, where a necropolis of more than one hundred tombs (8th-6th century BC) was discovered in 1908.

The village developed at the foot of the hill after the Riforma fondiaria (land reform) in the 1950s.

Buildings 
 Maria Regina del Mondo, main parish church of the village, it was built in 1959 and designed by Carlo Boccianti.
 Farm of Marsiliana (12th century), old castle built by the Aldobrandeschi, it was then held by the Republic of Siena and then by the Medicis. It became a property of the Corsini family from Florence in the 18th century and they transformed the building into a fortified farmhouse. Next to the farm there is the chapel of Sant'Antonio Abate.
 Castle of Stachilagi (12th century), ancient fortification built by the Aldobrandeschi, it's now in ruins.

References

Bibliography 
  Emanuele Repetti, «Marsiliana», Dizionario Geografico Fisico Storico della Toscana, 1833–1846.
 Antonio Minto, Marsiliana d'Albegna. Le scoperte archeologiche del principe don Tommaso Corsini, Florence, 1921.
 Andrea Camilli, Alice del Re, Carmine Sanchirico, Alessandra Pecci, Lucia Salvini, Elena Santoro, Andrea Zifferero, Evoluzione e caratteri del paesaggio protostorico ed etrusco a Marsiliana d'Albegna (Manciano, GR), in Nuccia Negroni Catacchio, Paesaggi reali e paesaggi mentali. Ricerche e scavi. Preistoria e protostoria in Etruria, Atti VIII, Milan, 2008, pp. 195–210.

See also 
 Montemerano
 Poderi di Montemerano
 Poggio Capanne
 Poggio Murella
 San Martino sul Fiora
 Saturnia

Frazioni of Manciano